Frankenbury Camp is the site of an Iron Age univallate hillfort located in Hampshire. The site is on a very slight promontory overlooking the Avon Valley on the north-western edge of the New Forest. The fort encloses approximately 11 acres. It has very steep natural slopes on the west and south sides. The northeast sides are defended by a simple rampart and ditch. The original entrance on the southeast corner has since been widened. It is listed as a scheduled ancient monument no.122. The site is currently pasture, and part of Folds Farm, for the most part, although the earthworks themselves are lined with trees and the south and western parts are now encroached by woodland. Various archaeological relics have been found in the area:

Iron Age/Roman Pottery:
 At a permanent caravan site in an old gravel pit 
 Located east of caravan site in old gravel pit.
 On farmland east of Criddlestyle .
 Garden Cottage, Godshill. Located behind the cottage.
 Located north west of Mews Hill Copse

Iron Age Coins
 Durotrigian Silver Stater found in garden of Ambridge, Tinker's Cross, 1969.

Roman Coins:
 Found behind either Redlands or Garden Cottage, Godshill 
 Located in the garden of Avon Lodge. 1930. A coin of Constantine 306-337 A.D 

The artefacts are now in Salisbury Museum.

Location

Immediately to the South lies the Sandy Balls estate. The hill has a summit of 70m AOD.

References



Iron Age sites in England
Buildings and structures in Hampshire
Hill forts in Hampshire
Archaeological sites in Hampshire